David French nicknamed "Frog" is an Australian former professional rugby league footballer who played in the 1980s. He played for Eastern Suburbs and Balmain in NSWRL competition.

Playing career
French made his first grade debut for Balmain in round 1 of the 1984 NSWRL season against the Illawarra Steelers. French played ten games for Balmain before departing the club. In 1985, French was selected to play in the annual City vs Country Origin game. In 1986, French signed for Eastern Suburbs. In round 11 of the 1988 NSWRL season, French broke the jaw of Manly player Dale Shearer. Shearer was later awarded $60,000 in compensation. French played one final season with Easts in 1989 but was released at the end of the season.

References

1963 births
Sydney Roosters players
Balmain Tigers players
Australian rugby league players
Country New South Wales rugby league team players
Rugby league centres
Rugby league wingers
Living people